David Patten (1974–2021) was an American football player.

David Patten may also refer to:

David W. Patten (1799–1838), American leader in the Latter Day Saint movement
David Patten (basketball) (born 1984), American basketball player

See also
David Patton (disambiguation)
David Paton (disambiguation)